Marlon Derrick Saunders is an American singer, songwriter, record producer and a "Professor of Voice" at Berklee College of Music. He is perhaps best known for his work on the video games Sonic Adventure (1998) and Sonic Adventure 2 (2001).

Career
A professor of voice at Berklee College of Music, Saunders has two solo recordings on his independent label, Black Honey Records: the improvisational A Groove So Deep: The Live Sessions and 2003's Enter My Mind. Marlon continues to write, sing and produce with acid-jazz band, Jazzhole. He co-produced and co-wrote Love 360, the debut jazzy soul project from April Hill released in fall of 2007. His own new soul recording, Birth of Revelation, was released later that year.

He is part of the Afrobeat-Soul band, Iqram & The Immigrant Groove.

From 2015-2017, Marlon toured with Stevie Wonder on The Songs In The Key of Life Tour as choir director. He has served as vocal contractor for Sam Smith, Bastille, Logic, Mondo Cozmo and Andrea Bocelli.

Marlon has worked with various artists, including Cynthia Erivo, Michael Jackson, Lauryn Hill, Javier Colon, Billy Joel, Sting, Bobby McFerrin, Joe Henderson, Ron Carter, Shawn Colvin, Nine Inch Nails, Jane Siberry, Shania Twain, Martha Wash, and Dance Theatre of Harlem.

His song "The Beginning of Never" has appeared on the Soul Lounge compilation, which featured artists such as Antionque, Nuwamba, Eric Roberson, Conya Doss, and others.

He has contributed to the video game scene as well, particularly games made by Sega. He is best known for doing vocals on both versions of Knuckles' theme, "Unknown From M.E." in Sonic Adventure and Sonic Adventure 2. Marlon also performs on the soundtrack to the Burning Rangers game, singing one of the ending songs, "We are Burning Rangers". He also performed a Christmas a cappella version of "Dreams Dreams", the theme from Nights into Dreams, with a small vocal ensemble that can be heard during the ending credits of Christmas Nights as well as on its soundtrack.

Marlon made a brief appearance in the film Enchanted as a calypso singer who sings "That's How You Know" with Amy Adams.

Discography

Solo albums 
 Enter My Mind (2003)
 A Groove So Deep (2005)

Jazzhole albums
The Jazzhole (February 22, 1994, Mesa/BlueMoon Recordings)
…And the Feeling Goes Round (August 29, 1995, Mesa/BlueMoon Recordings)
The Beat Is the Bomb! (Remixes) (June 18, 1996, Mesa/BlueMoon Recordings)
Blackburst (February 29, 2000, Beave Music)
Circle of the Sun (November 1, 2002, Beave Music)
Poet's Walk (July 13, 2006, Beave Music)

References

External links
 Marlon Saunders Official Site

Jazzhole Official Site

Living people
American singer-songwriters
Record producers from Maryland
Year of birth missing (living people)
Jazzhole members
Berklee College of Music faculty
Berklee College of Music alumni